Bitburg Middle-High School (generally referred to as BMHS), originally opened in 1956, was part of the Kaiserslautern School District and had a student population of approximately 230 with a faculty of thirty. It was situated in Rhineland-Palatinate, Germany. In the 2013-14 school year, the Bitburg Middle School was integrated into the high school.

Although Bitburg Middle-High School was located at the Bitburg Air Base housing complex, many of the students that attend this school live at the Spangdahlem Air Base or villages in the surrounding areas. Over the course of the next decade, a new middle/high school will be built at the Spangdahlem Air Base.

Bitburg Middle-High School was a member of the Department of Defense Dependents Schools network. It implemented and a Block Scheduling/Seminar schedule during the 1994–1995 school year.

In 2017, Bitburg Middle-High School closed. in preparation for a complete hand over of the Bitburg grounds back to German control in 2018. Students and faculty moved to Spangdahlem.

Accreditation
Bitburg Middle-High School is fully accredited by AdvancED.

Technology
There are three computer labs and students have access to 12 carrels containing laptop computers. Additionally, there is a intranet in which students can save files to their own server partition.

A wide variety of distance learning courses are offered, including Marine Biology, French, AP Macroeconomics, AP Calculus BC and AP Statistics.

Advanced classes
Bitburg Middle-High School offers many Advanced Placement courses through the College Board program.

Athletics
There is interscholastic competition for boys and girls during these three seasons. All athletes must abide by the Bitburg HS athletic code. A physical examination each year is required to try out, practice or play. All students must maintain academic eligibility in order to participate in the athletics program.

Fall
Football- 
Women's Volleyball Division II 3rd Place 2014, Division II 2nd Place 2015, Division II 1st Place 2016
Golf
Cross Country Division II 2nd place women's 2015, 3rd place men's 2015
Tennis
Cheerleading – Bitburg has won the Division II European Championships 2000, 2001, 2002, 2003, 2004, 2005, 2006, 2007, 2009, 2010, and holds the longest winning streak for cheer in European history.

Winter
Wrestling – won the Division II European Championship in 2001, 2002 and 2012
Men's Basketball - 2000 Division II European Champions  
Women's Basketball – Won Division II European Championship in 2013 and 2015, Division II 2nd place 2016 and 2017
Cheerleading

Spring
Track & Field- Men's Division II Champions 2012, Women's Division II 2nd Place 2014, Women's Division II 3rd Place 2017
Women's Softball
Men's Baseball – Division II European Champions 2009, 2011, 2nd Place 2012, 2016, and 2017
Men's Soccer
Women's Soccer - Division II 2nd place 2016

Extracurricular activities
Bitburg offers a various number of clubs for students to join.
Each club elects at least one position (Senator) and may select up to six (Secretary, Vice President, President, etc.)

Freshman Class
Sophomore Class
Junior Class
Senior Class
National Honor Society *
German Honors Society *
Spanish Honors Society *
German Club
Spanish Club
Model United Nations
National Junior Honor Society
Yearbook (also offered as class)
Student Council
FBLA (Future Business Leader of America)
JROTC Drill Team

 *: Denotes entrance requirement

Eifel School Systems
The following schools feed into Bitburg High School either directly or indirectly:
 Bitburg Elementary School (indirectly)
 Spangdahlem Middle School (directly)

References

External links
 The Official Site of Bitburg High School
 Bitburg High School Alumni Association

Schools in Rhineland-Palatinate
Department of Defense Education Activity